The Greek Orthodox Patriarch of Alexandria has the title Pope and Patriarch of Alexandria and all Africa.

The following list contains all the incumbents of the Greek Orthodox Patriarchate of Alexandria.

Hierarchs of Alexandria before the Council of Chalcedon

Archbishops 
Mark the Evangelist (43–68) 
Anianus (68–82)
Avilius (83–95)
Kedronus (96–106)
Primus (106–118)
Justus (118–129)
Eumenes (131–141)
Markianos (142–152)
Celadion (152–166)
Agrippinus (167–178)
Julian (178–189)
Demetrius I (189–232)
Heraclas (232–248)
Dionysius (248–264)
Maximus (265–282)
Theonas (282–300)
Peter I (300–311)
Achillas (312–313)

Patriarchs 
 In 325, the 6th canon of the First Ecumenical Council granted to Alexandria the jurisdiction over all the provinces of Egypt.
Alexander I (313–326) First ecumenical Council occurred
vacant (326–328)
Athanasius I (328–339) Served as a Deacon for the First Council; became Pope of Alexandria
Gregory of Cappadocia (339–346), Arian Patriarch; not accepted by the adherents of the Nicene creed (and thus not counted by Coptic Orthodox, Byzantine Orthodox or Catholic lineages).
Athanasius I (346–373) (restored)
Peter II (373–380)
Lucius of Alexandria (373–377), an Arian installed by the Emperor and not recognized by the adherents of the Nicene Creed
Timothy I (380–385) Second Ecumenical Council occurred
Theophilus I (385–412)
Cyril I (412–444) Third Ecumenical Council occurred
Dioscorus I (444–451) Fourth Ecumenical Council occurred - Schism between Eastern Orthodoxy and Oriental Orthodoxy -  Dioscorus was deposed by the Council of Chalcedon

Greek Orthodox patriarchs of Alexandria after Chalcedon 
Proterius (451–457)vacant (457–460)
Timothy III Salophakiolos (460–475)vacant (475–477)
Timothy III Salophakiolos (477–482) (restored)
John I Talaias (482)vacant (482–536)
Gainas (536–537)
Paul (537–542)
Zoilus (542–551)
Apollinarius (551–569)
John IV (569–579)vacant (579–581)
Eulogius I (581–608)
Theodore I (608–610)
John V the Merciful (610–621)
George I (621–630)
Cyrus (631–641) Islam entered Egyptvacant (641–642)
Peter IV (642–651)
Theodore II
Peter V
Peter VI
Theophylactus
Onopsus
Cosmas I (727–768)
Politianus (768–813)
Eustatius (813–817)
Christopher I (817–841)
Sophronius I (841–860)
Michael I (860–870)
Michael II (870–903)vacant (903–907)
Christodoulos (907–932)
Eutychius (932–940)
Sophronius II (941)
Isaac (941–954)
Job (954–960)vacant (960–963)
Elias I (963–1000)
Arsenius (1000–1010)
Theophilus (1010–1020)
George II (1021–1051)
Leontius (1052–1059)
Alexander II (1059–1062)
John VI Kodonatos (1062–1100)
Eulogius II (1100–1117) Coadjutor?
Cyril II (1100–    )
Sabbas (1117–    )
Theodosius II (    –1137) Coadjutor?
Sophronius III (1137–1171)
Elias II (1171–1175)
Eleutherius (1175–1180)
Mark III (1180–1209)
Nicholas I (1210–1243)
Gregory I (1243–1263)
Nicholas II (1263–1276)
Athanasius III (1276–1316)
Gregory II (1316–1354)
Gregory III (1354–1366)
Niphon (1366–1385)
Mark IV (1385–1389)
Nicholas III (1389–1398)
Gregory IV (1398–1412)
Nicholas IV (1412–1417)
Athanasius IV (1417–1425)
Mark V (1425–1435)
Philotheus (1435–1459)
Mark VI (1459–1484)
Gregory V (1484–1486)
Joachim Pany (1486–1567)vacant (1567–1569)
Silvester (1569–1590)
Meletius I (1590–1601)
Cyril III Loucaris (1601–1620)
Gerasimus I Spartaliotes (1620–1636)
Metrophanes Kritikopoulos (1636–1639)
Nicephorus (1639–1645)
Joannicius (1645–1657)
Paisius (1657–1678)
Parthenius I (1678–1688)
Gerasimus II Paladas (1688–1710)
Samuel Kapasoulis (1710–1712)
Cosmas II (1712–1714)
Samuel (restored) (1714–1723)
Cosmas II (restored) (1723–1736)
Cosmas III (1737–1746)
Matthew Psaltis (1746–1766)
Cyprian (1766–1783)
Gerasimus III Gimaris (1783–1788)
Parthenius II Pankostas (1788–1805)
Theophilus III Pankostas (1805–1825)
Hierotheus I (1825–1845)
Artemius (1845–1847)
Hierotheus II (1847–1858)
Callinicus (1858–1861)
Jacob (1861–1865)
Nicanor (1866–1869)
Nilus (1869-1870)	
Sophronius IV (1870–1899)
Photius (1900–1925)
Meletius II Metaxakis (1926–1935)
Nicholas V (1936–1939)
Christopher II (1939–1966)vacant'' (1966–1968)
Nicholas VI (1968–1986)
Parthenius III (1986–1996)
Peter VII (1997–2004)
Theodore II (2004–present)

See also
Greek Orthodox Church of Alexandria
List of Patriarchs of Alexandria, for the earlier Patriarchs of Alexandria prior to the schism.
List of Coptic Orthodox Popes of Alexandria, for the Popes of the Coptic Orthodox Church.

References

Patriarchs, Greek Orthodox
Eastern Orthodoxy-related lists
Alexandria
Greek Orthodox Patriarchs of Alexandria
Greek Orthodox Patriarchs
  
Alexandria-related lists

pt:Anexo:Lista de patriarcas de Alexandria da Igreja Ortodoxa Grega